Citizen Zombie is the third studio album by The Pop Group, released on 23 February 2015 by Freaks R Us. It marks the first album of new studio material by the band since For How Much Longer Do We Tolerate Mass Murder?, released thirty-five years prior in 1980.

Track listing

Personnel 
The Pop Group
 Dan Catsis – bass guitar
 Gareth Sager – guitar, saxophone, keyboards
 Bruce Smith – drums, percussion
 Mark Stewart – vocals

Additional musicians
 Chiara Meattelli – backing vocals
 Skip McDonald – backing vocals
 Isla Rainforth – backing vocals
 Kate Rodd – backing vocals
 Pete Wareham – tenor saxophone

Technical
 Paul Epworth – production, guitar, backing vocals

Release history

References

External links 
 
 Citizen Zombie at Bandcamp

2015 albums
The Pop Group albums
Albums produced by Paul Epworth